Great Britain is a large island near the coast of Western Europe.

Great Britain may also refer to:

Places
 Kingdom of Great Britain, a sovereign state from 1707 to 1800
 United Kingdom of Great Britain and Ireland, the United Kingdom from 1801 to 1927
 United Kingdom of Great Britain and Northern Ireland, a modern state from 1927

Vehicles
 SS Great Britain, a passenger steamship launched in 1843 and now preserved in Bristol, United Kingdom
 Great Britain, a GWR 3031 Class locomotive, built in 1892 and retired in 1914

Other uses
 Great Britain (play), by Richard Bean
 National sports teams of the United Kingdom

See also
 Terminology of the British Isles
 England
 Britannia
 British Isles
 Britain (disambiguation)
 Briton (disambiguation)
 British (disambiguation)